María Alejandra Vicuña Muñoz (born 13 February 1978) is an Ecuadorian politician who served as the Vice President of Ecuador under President Lenin Moreno between January and December 2018, previously as the Housing and Urban Development Minister of Ecuador.

Career 
Vicuña was first elected to serve in the National Assembly in 2009, and was re-elected to serve again in 2013. While serving in the National Assembly, she served as vice president of the largest commission relating to the health and wellbeing of Ecuadorean citizens, and was a founding member of the Commission on Education, Science, Technology, and Communication.

She was named Minister of Urban Development and Housing by President Lenin Moreno in May 2017. Upon the suspension of Vice President Jorge Glas, Vicuña was named Acting Vice President until such time that Glas's corruption charges were sorted out.

Vice President of Ecuador 

Glas was convicted for corruption in connection to the Odebrecht bribery scandal in December 2017.  The National Assembly then elected a new Vice President from a candidate shortlist chosen by President Moreno.

On 6 January 2018, Vicuña was formally sworn in as Vice President of Ecuador. She was confirmed after 70 assembly members voted for her to take office, 17 lawmakers voting against the nomination, and 19 abstentions. She was the second woman to ever serve as Vice President of Ecuador, after Rosalía Arteaga took office in 1996.

On December 3, 2018, Vicuña was suspended from her duties as vice president after a corruption scandal. On 4 December 2018, Vicuña announced her desire to resign as vice president. On 11 December 2018, Otto Sonnenholzner was elected as Vice President of Ecuador after the National Assembly approved him for the position.

In 2020 she was sentenced to one year in prison for extorting payments from her political advisors in exchange for continued employment. In 2021, this sentence was increased to two years; in October 2022, the prison sentence was reduced to one year, but she was required to pay restitution within six months.

References

External links

|-

1978 births
Living people
People from Guayaquil
Vice presidents of Ecuador
PAIS Alliance politicians
Women government ministers of Ecuador
Ecuadorian feminists
Women vice presidents
Ecuadorian politicians convicted of crimes
21st-century Ecuadorian women politicians
21st-century Ecuadorian politicians
20th-century Ecuadorian politicians